Zion Tzemah (born January 19, 1990) is an Israeli footballer who plays for Maccabi Sha'arayim as an attacking midfielder.

References

1990 births
Living people
Israeli footballers
People from Kiryat Ono
Maccabi Tel Aviv F.C. players
Sektzia Ness Ziona F.C. players
Hapoel Ramat Gan F.C. players
Maccabi Petah Tikva F.C. players
F.C. Ashdod players
Hakoah Maccabi Amidar Ramat Gan F.C. players
Enosis Neon Paralimni FC players
Hapoel Acre F.C. players
Beitar Jerusalem F.C. players
Hapoel Ashkelon F.C. players
Hapoel Iksal F.C. players
Hapoel Bnei Lod F.C. players
Hapoel Rishon LeZion F.C. players
Maccabi Sha'arayim F.C. players
Liga Leumit players
Israeli Premier League players
Cypriot First Division players
Israel under-21 international footballers
Association football midfielders
Expatriate footballers in Cyprus
Israeli expatriate sportspeople in Cyprus
Israeli people of Iraqi-Jewish descent